The 2001 Western Michigan Broncos football team represented Western Michigan University in the Mid-American Conference (MAC) during the 2001 NCAA Division I-A football season.  In their fifth season under head coach Gary Darnell, the Broncos compiled a 5–6 record (4–5 against MAC opponents), finished in fourth place in the MAC's West Division, and outscored their opponents, 277 to 266.  The team played its home games at Waldo Stadium in Kalamazoo, Michigan.

The team's statistical leaders included Jeff Welsh with 1,702 passing yards, Philip Reed with 539 rushing yards, and Joshua Bush with 617 receiving yards.

Schedule

References

Western Michigan
Western Michigan Broncos football seasons
Western Michigan Broncos football